The following article presents a Timeline of the Poor Law system from its origins in the Tudor and Elizabethan era to its abolition in 1948.

1300s
1344- Royal Ordinance stated that lepers should leave London.
1388- Statute of Cambridge passed.

1400s
1494- Vagabonds and Beggars Act 1494 was passed.
1499- Vagabonds and Beggars Act 1494 was disputed in parliament.

1500s
1597 - The Act for the Relief of the Poor 1597 provides the first complete code of Poor Relief

1600s
1601 - Old Poor Law passed. This would remain the basis of the Poor Law system until 1834
1662 - Poor Relief Act 1662 passed to deal with the problems of settlement
1697 - Poor Act 1697 passed

1700s
1723 - the workhouses decided to give jobs to the poor so there wouldn't been so much of them on the street
1782 - Relief of the Poor Act 1782 passed.

1800s
1815 - The French Wars come to an end.
1830 - The Swing Riots highlight the possibility of agricultural unrest. 
1832 - The Royal Commission into the Operation of the Poor Laws begins its investigation into the Poor Law system
1834 - Poor Law Amendment Act passed
1842 - Outdoor Labour Test Order allows outdoor relief despite the Poor Law Amendment Act's ban on it
1844 - Outdoor Relief Prohibitory Order issued to further discourage outdoor relief
1847 - The Poor Law Commission is abolished and replaced by the Poor Law Board
1848 - The Huddersfield workhouse scandal occurs.
1865 - The Union Chargeability Act 1865 is passed
1867 - The Second Reform Act 
1871 - The Local Government Board takes the powers of the Poor Law Board

1900s
1905 - Royal Commission on the Poor Laws and Relief of Distress 1905-09 set up by the outgoing Conservative government.
1906 - The Liberal Government is elected and begins an ambitious programme of welfare reforms.  
1909 - The Minority report
1929 - The workhouse system is abolished by the Local Government Act 1929.
1948 - The Poor Law system abolished by the National Assistance Act 1948.

References

External links
Timeline

English Poor Laws